Kaa is a 1965 Oriya film directed by Siddhartha, which is a pseudonym for Gour Prasad Ghose, Parbati Ghose, & Ram Chandra Thakur. The film is based on Kanhu Charan Mohanty's award-winning  literary masterpiece in the same name. The Film glorifies the story of a barren woman, who induced her husband to marry another woman for the sake of the birth of a child.

Synopsis
Nandika (Parbati Ghose) and Sunanda (Gour Ghose) are happily married and live with mother-in-law Abhaya (Manimala Devi) and sister-in law Kuni in their ancestral rural home. After seven years of marriage, Nadika is still childless. Abhaya always worries about a successor to her family. Friends and relatives always blame and offend Nandika for her barrenness. So Nandika decides to make a sacrifice and convinces Sunanda to marry a girl again for the sake of a child.  With lot of pressure from his mother and wife, Sunanda does marry Lalita (Geetarani). Lalita compels Sunanda to take her to his home in the city and starts living there. Over time, destiny takes a turn and it is Nandika that gets pregnant. Lalita becomes envious fearing  Sunanda may not return to her. However, it so happens, Nandika dies after giving birth to a child. Lalita repents and adopts Nandika's child as her own child.

Cast
 Gour Prasad Ghose - Sunanda
 Parbati Ghose - Nandika
 Geetarani - Lalita
 Manimala Devi - Abhaya
 Byomokesh Tripathy 
 Krushna Chandra Pandey 
 Niranjan Satpathy 
 Mayadhar Raut
 Kumud Patnaik
 Gokulananda Parida 	
 Babaji Nayak	
 Kunjanada Sahu

Soundtrack
The music for the film is composed by Bhubanseswar Misra.

Trivia
The film's director, music composer and heroine have pseudonym names.

Box office
The film was made on a budget of INR 1,12,500.00. The film got a huge response and was a box office hit.

Awards
National Film Awards1966
 President's Silver medal for Best Odia film.

References

External links

1965 films
1965 drama films
1960s Odia-language films
1966 drama films
1966 films